Tumusiime is a surname. Notable people with the surname include:
Emmanuel Tumusiime-Mutebile (1949–2022), Ugandan economist and banker
Flavia Tumusiime (born 1988),  Ugandan actress, radio and television host, voice-over artist
Geoffrey Tumusiime,  Ugandan military officer and diplomat
James R Tumusiime (born 1950), Ugandan author, journalist, and entrepreneur
Margaret Tumusiime (born 1962), archer from Uganda
Rosemary Tumusiime (born 1962), Ugandan marketing professional, public administrator, feminist and politician

Surnames of Ugandan origin